William McSeveney (4 March 1929 – 15 December 2021) was a Scottish footballer who was best known for his time at Motherwell.

McSeveney was born on 4 March 1929. He started his career with Wishaw Juniors before going senior with Dunfermline Athletic then moving to Motherwell in 1954 where he spent over a decade with the Fir Park club.

He died on 15 December 2021, at the age of 92.

References

1929 births
2021 deaths
Dunfermline Athletic F.C. players
Motherwell F.C. players
Scottish Football League players
Scottish footballers
Association football defenders